Maalik Bomar (born August 1, 1990) is a Canadian football linebacker who is a currently a free agent. He is a Grey Cup champion, having won with the Calgary Stampeders in 2014.

Early career
Bomar played high school football as an outside linebacker and wide receiver at Winton Woods High School from 2006 to 2008. He was a team captain for two years and was named Most Valuable Player in 2008.

From 2009 to 2012, Bomar played for the Cincinnati Bearcats of the University of Cincinnati as a linebacker and on special teams. Over four seasons, he totaled 223 tackles, one sack, one interception, and one touchdown.

Professional career
Bomar was signed by the Jacksonville Jaguars of the National Football League on April 28, 2013 as an undrafted free agent. He was released on August 25. Bomar worked out with the Cincinnati Bengals in early September 2013, but the Bengals did not sign him.

On May 27, 2014, Bomar was signed by the Calgary Stampeders. He spent time on the practice squad roster before being activated for the Week 4 game against the Hamilton Tiger-Cats. He played three games and recorded two special teams tackles and a fumble recovery in his rookie year. Bomar was active for the Grey Cup. He was released by the Stampeders on May 25, 2015.

References

1990 births
Living people
African-American players of American football
African-American players of Canadian football
American football linebackers
Calgary Stampeders players
Canadian football linebackers
Cincinnati Bearcats football players
Edmonton Elks players
Jacksonville Jaguars players
Players of American football from Cincinnati
Players of Canadian football from Cincinnati
21st-century African-American sportspeople